Jan Felix Knobel (born 16 January 1989 in Bad Homburg vor der Höhe) is a retired German decathlete.

He finished fifth at the 2005 World Youth Championships. At the 2008 World Junior Championships in Bydgoszcz he won the title with 7896 points in the decathlon. The final margin of victory over Belarusian Eduard Mikhan was only two points.

At the German Championships in 2009, Knobel took part in the senior class, although he would have been eligible to start in the juniors, and secured the victory with 7738 points.

Knobel's personal best is 8288 points, which he reached the end of May 2011 at the 2011 Hypo-Meeting in Götzis. Shortly after, he started as a co-favorite at the 2011 European U23 Championships in Ostrava. After a fall in the 110-meter hurdles he had to bury all medal hopes. Even the final 1500-meter race, he did not finish and ended up with 6774 points in 19th place.

He peaked his career with an eighth place at the 2011 World Championships. He subsequently did not finish the 2012 Olympic decathlon, and nor the 2013 Summer Universiade either.

Since 2005, Knobel has competed for the athletics department of Eintracht Frankfurt and is coached by Jürgen Sammert. He studied architecture at the University of Rhine-Main, Wiesbaden.

References

External links 
 
 
 
 

1989 births
Living people
German decathletes
Athletes (track and field) at the 2012 Summer Olympics
Olympic athletes of Germany
World Athletics Championships athletes for Germany
People from Bad Homburg vor der Höhe
Sportspeople from Darmstadt (region)